Dasan-myeon is a subdivision of Goryeong County, Gyeongsangbuk-do, South Korea, in the county's northeast.  It is composed of ten ri.  Dasan-myeon looks across the Nakdong River at Daegu, and also borders Seongju County to the north.  To the south it is bounded by Goryeong's Seongsan-myeon.  A largely rural district, Dasan-myeon is home to about 7,400 people living on 46 square kilometers.

See also
Geography of South Korea
Subdivisions of South Korea

External links
Local government website, in Korean

Goryeong County
Towns and townships in North Gyeongsang Province